Chloroclystis approximata, the cherry looper moth, is a moth in the family Geometridae. It was described by Francis Walker in 1869. It is found in Australia (New South Wales, Victoria and Tasmania).

Adults are variable in colour, ranging from green to brown or grey, with a scalloped banded pattern.

The larvae feed on the flowers and young fruit of Prunus avium, Malus domestica and Acacia dealbata. They are variable in colour, ranging from green to yellow or even brown.

References

External links

Moths described in 1869
approximata
Moths of Australia